Mehmed Selim Pasha or Mehmed Selim Sırrı Pasha (1771 Bender, Moldova – 1831 Damascus, Ottoman Empire, nickname: "Benderli") was an Ottoman statesman. He was Grand Vizier of the Ottoman Empire. He ruled from 14 September 1824 to 24 October 1828 as Grand Vizier of sultan Mahmud II and failed in the fight against the Greek War of Independence. The Auspicious Incident (Vaka-i Hayriye), the Battle of Navarino (1827), happened during his period in office. In 1828–30 he became Wali (governor) of Rumelia Province and 1830–31 Wali of Damascus (Syria). When the citizens of Damascus and the local garrison of Janissaries rose in revolt against him, Selim Pasha sought refuge into the Citadel of Damascus. After a siege lasting 40 days he was promised safe passage but murdered before he could leave the city.

Sources 

People from Bender, Moldova
19th-century Grand Viziers of the Ottoman Empire
Ottoman governors of Damascus
Moldavian Muslims
1771 births
1831 deaths
Ottoman people of the Greek War of Independence